Tsav is a village in the Kapan Municipality of the Syunik Province in Armenia. The village has a fish farm, a school and a clinic.

Demographics 
The village's population was 74 at the 2011 census, down from 157 at the 2001 census.

Municipal administration 
The village was the center of the Tsav community, which contained the villages of Tsav and Shishkert until the June 2017 administrative and territorial reforms, when the village became a part of the Kapan Municipality. The Statistical Committee of Armenia reported Tsav community's population as 351 in 2010, down from 499 at the 2001 census.

Gallery

References 

Populated places in Syunik Province